In the aftermath of World War I, King Ibn Saud wanted to annex Kuwait into Saudi Arabia. Border conflicts were fought in 1919–1920, in which the Kuwaitis successfully fought them off with British assistance. Following the war the Saudis imposed a trade blockade on Kuwait from 1923 until 1937, which heavily impacted the Kuwaiti economy. The goal of the Saudi pressure was to annex as much Kuwaiti territory as possible. At the Uqair conference of 1922 which was convened to decide on the borders between some of the newly formed Arab states, Ibn Saud succeeded in persuading British diplomat Sir Percy Cox, the high commissioner in Iraq, to give the Saudis two-thirds of Kuwaiti territory. There were no Kuwaiti representatives at the conference. This event set Kuwait's modern boundaries. 

Both are members of the Gulf Cooperation Council.  Historically there was a Saudi–Kuwaiti neutral zone inhabited by coastal fishermen; however, with the discovery of oil, the countries agreed to divide the territory, and reached an agreement in 1969.

In 1990, following the Iraqi invasion of Kuwait, Saudi Arabia participated in the Gulf War to expel Iraqi forces from the country. Some of the Kuwaiti Royal family members fled to Saudi Arabia during this time. Saudi and Coalition forces also repelled Iraqi forces when they breached the Kuwaiti-Saudi border in 1991 (known as the Battle of Khafji).  

Although Kuwait and Saudi Arabia are allies and cooperate within OPEC and the GCC, Riyadh disputes Kuwait's ownership of the Qaruh and Umm al Maradim islands.

See also
Foreign relations of Kuwait 
Foreign relations of Saudi Arabia
Kuwait–Saudi Arabia border

References 

 

 
Saudi Arabia
Bilateral relations of Saudi Arabia